Peter Winters (born 21 July 1956) is a Belgian sailor. He competed in the 470 event at the 1976 Summer Olympics.

References

External links
 

1956 births
Living people
Belgian male sailors (sport)
Olympic sailors of Belgium
Sailors at the 1976 Summer Olympics – 470
People from Merksem